Sequal is the only album by Sequal.

The album was later re-issued with an accompanying disc of remixes by Cherry Red on its Cherry Pop label.

Track listing

2012 reissue bonus tracks

References

1988 debut albums
Capitol Records albums
Sequal (group) albums
Albums produced by Kurtis Mantronik
Albums produced by Stock Aitken Waterman